Gujarat Parivartan Party was a political party from Gujarat, India. It was founded by Keshubhai Patel in August 2012. It performed poorly in 2012 assembly elections. It was expanded with the merging of the Mahagujarat Janata Party. Later it was merged back with the Bharatiya Janata Party (BJP) in February 2014.

Formation
GPP was founded by former Chief Minister of Gujarat Keshubhai Patel on 6 August 2012. Gordhan Zadafia led Mahagujarat Janata Party dissolved itself in the Gujarat Parivartan Party.

2012 Gujarat legislative assembly elections
Gujarat Parivartan Party performed poorly and won two seats in 2012 Gujarat legislative assembly election.
 Keshubhai Patel - Visavadar constituency
 Nalin Kotadiya - Dhari constituency

Merger with BJP 
GPP MLA Keshubhai Patel resigned following his ill health in early February 2014.

President of GPP Gordhan Zadafia announced merger of GPP with the Bharatiya Janata Party (BJP) on 24 February 2014. Senior leader of GPP and  former chief minister Suresh Mehta opposed the decision. Nalin Kotadiya who represented Dhari in the Gujarat Legislative Assembly joined BJP along with party.

References

External links
 Official website

Bharatiya Janata Party breakaway groups
Defunct political parties in Gujarat
Political parties established in 2012
Political parties disestablished in 2014
2012 establishments in Gujarat
2014 disestablishments in India